The 2006 World Junior Figure Skating Championships were held in Ljubljana, Slovenia from March 6 to 12. Skaters competed in four disciplines: men's singles, ladies' singles, pair skating, and ice dancing.

The event was open to figure skaters from ISU member nations who on July 1, 2005, had reached the age of 13 but had not yet turned 19 (or 21 for male pair skaters and ice dancers).

The term "Junior" refers to the age level rather than the skill level. Therefore, some of the skaters competing had competed nationally and internationally at the senior level, but were still age-eligible for Junior Worlds.

The compulsory dance was the Austrian Waltz. Due to the large number of participants, the men's and ladies' qualifying groups were split into groups A and B. Scores did not carry over from qualifying.

Medals table

Results

Men

Ladies

Pairs

Ice dancing

External links

 2006 World Junior Figure Skating Championships
 Official site

World Junior Figure Skating Championships
World Junior Figure Skating Championships, 2006
F
World Junior 2006